Osmancık railway station is a railway station in the village of Tepeköy, Niğde in Turkey. The station consists of a side platform serving one tracks.

TCDD Taşımacılık operates a daily intercity train, the Taurus Express from Konya to Adana.

References

External links
TCDD Taşımacılık
Passenger trains
Osmancık station timetable

Railway stations in Niğde Province